Harry Brighton (1893-1975) was an Australian rugby league footballer who played in the 1910s.  He played for Glebe and South Sydney in the NSWRL competition.

Playing career
Brighton made his first grade debut for Glebe in Round 1 1911 against Western Suburbs at the Sydney Sports Ground.  

Brighton played 16 times for Glebe in 1911 as the club finished first on the table and claimed the minor premiership.  Brighton played at hooker in the 1911 NSWRL grand final against Eastern Suburbs at the Agricultural Ground.  In a tight match, Easts emerged victorious winning their first premiership by a score of 11–8 in front of 20,000 spectators.

In 1912, Brighton played 14 games as Glebe finished second on the table but were again runners up to Eastern Suburbs as they claimed their second premiership.

In 1913, Brighton joined South Sydney and played with them for one season before retiring.  At representative level, Brighton played for New South Wales and Metropolis in 1912.

References

Glebe rugby league players
South Sydney Rabbitohs players
New South Wales rugby league team players
Rugby league players from Sydney
Rugby league hookers
Rugby league second-rows
1893 births
1975 deaths